Lambis lambis, common name the spider conch, is a species of large sea snail, a marine gastropod mollusk in the family Strombidae, the true conchs.

Distribution
This species is widespread in the Indo-West Pacific, including Aldabra, Kenya, Madagascar, Mauritius, Mozambique, the Persian Gulf and the Red Sea, Seychelles, Tanzania, maritime Southeast Asia, Micronesia, eastern Melanesia, Taiwan, southern Japan and northern Australia.

Shell description

The maximum shell length for this species is up to 29 cm, and average length stands for 18 cm.
Lambis lambis has a very large, robust and heavy shell. One of its most striking characteristics is its flared outer lip, ornamented by six hollow marginal digitations. These digitations present subtle differences in shape between genders in this species, as the three anteriormost digitations are  short and posteriorly bent in male individuals, and longer and dorsally recurved in females.<ref name="Poutiers">{{cite book|last=Poutiers|first=J. M.|title=The living marine resources of the Western Central Pacific Volume 1. Seaweeds, corals, bivalves and gastropods|editor=Carpenter, K. E.|editor2=Niem, V. H.|publisher=FAO|location=Rome|date=1998|series=FAO Species Identification Guide for Fishery Purposes|pages=467|chapter=Gastropods|isbn=92-5-104051-6|url=ftp://ftp.fao.org/docrep/fao/009/w7191e/w7191e33.pdf}}</ref> The color of the shell is highly variable, being white or cream externally and often presenting brown, purplish or bluish black patches. The interior is glazed and may be pink, orange or purple.

Ecology
Habitat
This sea snail lives in mangrove areas, as well as reef flats and coral-rubble bottoms in shallow water from low tide levels to depths of 5m. It is usually found in association with red algae.

Feeding habitsLambis lambis'' is known to be herbivorous, feeding on fine red algae.

References

External links 

Sealifebase.org
 

Strombidae
Gastropods described in 1758
Taxa named by Carl Linnaeus